Deer Valley High School may refer to:

 Deer Valley High School (California)
 Deer Valley High School (Arizona)